Stargaze can refer to:

 Stargazing, amateur astronomical activity
 Stargaze (musical collective), musical collective founded by André de Ridder
 StarGaze, annual charity event in Buffalo, New York